St Ann's is a large district of the city of Nottingham, in the English ceremonial county of Nottinghamshire. The population of the district at the time of the United Kingdom census, 2011 was 19,316.

History
The Oswell was a cold water well with alleged magical powers that could cure sore eyes. In 1500, the name changed to honour St Ann, whose cult was ascendant at the time. St Ann was the patron saint of lacemakers, pregnancy and women who had difficulty in conceiving. Water from the well fed a beck (stream) that ran through "The Spring" to the river. There are several ancient names attached to area Peas Hill (1230), Hunger Hills (1304) and Clay Fields.

In the 1750s Charles Morley started manufacturing brown earthenware, specialising in beer mugs.

In the 1830s Clay fields was divided into plots. With The Enclosure Act of 1845 allowed the city to take  of the Clay fields. It was used for housing, and by 1880 the build of 'New Town' was complete. It was specifically built for the working poor. They were very basic cottages, with a butcher, a baker, a large number of public houses, a market place and, for the first time in Britain, allotments where the poor could grow their vegetables. The Public Health Act 1875 enabled local authorities to make byelaws to regulate such building. Here all the houses were pre-Public Health Act terraced houses, on a gridiron plan arranged around courts of ten houses. These were later demolished under slum clearance legislation of the 1960s.

The estate was a town within a town, the local constabulary refused to enter St Ann's estate, so policing was managed by the residents relying on 'family affiliation'. It was an area of hard work and low pay that culturally was separate from Nottingham. But it was an area of 10,000 houses where only 9% had an inside toilet, and 50% had no hot water system- many of the yards had shared toilets and open sewers leading to dysentery and cholera. Infant mortality was three times the national average. The latest immigrants, and in 1968 that meant West Indians and Jamaican in particular, had been allocated the worst housing. Clearances of houses such as these started in 1930, but because of the war 'New Town' continued until 1970. The houses were flattened and the residents dispersed.

In 1970, the Victorian streets were replaced with a Radburn style estate. While this introduced a more modern housing stock, the confusing pattern of facing houses with differing street names and the maze of undistinguishable walk-ways made the new estate impenetrable to outsiders. The houses were built by Wimpey, using prefabricated techniques. The first residents were proud of the houses, but critical of the design of the estate.

Government
St Ann's lies within the unitary authority of Nottingham, and so is governed by Nottingham City Council.

Geography
St Ann's lies east of Nottingham city centre, with Thorneywood to the north east and Carlton Road forming the unofficial boundary with Sneinton to the south.

Demography
In common with other parts of the city, the largely working-class population is still affected by the collapse of manufacturing industry and much of the area scores badly on government measures of deprivation.  It is ethnically mixed with a strong sense of community. The population in 2005 was around 15,000.

St Ann's is home to people from all over the world, such as: Pakistan, Afghanistan, the West Indies, Iran, Romania, Greece, Portugal, Italy, Spain, Turkey, Somalia, Sudan, South Sudan, Brazil, Mexico, Guinea, Thailand, China, Japan and South Korea.

The area has a Pakistani Community Centre and the African Caribbean National Artistic Center (ACNA).

Economy
In the nineteenth century, the local industries were lace and textile manufacturing, like most of Nottingham.

There is the St Ann's market, which has won EU backing of £200,000,000 to regenerate the market back into its former heyday.

There are several ethnic run supermarkets from Jamaican to Pakistani, from Somali to Portuguese and from Italian to Greek. The two main ethnic supermarkets are Murat (which is Iranian) and Asiana, which is the largest oriental retail outlet in the East Midlands.

Culture and community
The area takes its name from St Ann's Well, a spring once thought to have miraculous healing powers, at the junction of The Wells Road and Kildare Road. It was also known as The Brodewell, the Owswell, Robin Hood's Well, in records dating back to 1301. The people of Nottingham used to walk to St Ann's Well on Easter ('Black') Monday and celebrate with a party. It was covered by a spired structure from 1856 to 1887, which was demolished to make way for the railway and later built over by what became The Gardeners pub.

Stonebridge City Farm, which charges no admission fee, is an urban farm that is active in the community.

The last pub in the area was the Sycamore Inn, which closed in April 2014.

Landmarks
The terraces north of Victoria Park have been listed as representing a style of domestic architecture that was once widespread but has been largely lost to bomb damage and slum clearance.

The St Ann's Allotments is the oldest and largest allotment site in England, created in the 1830s and now Grade 2* listed as being of "Special Historic Interest". The allotments have received National Lottery funding for restoration, and were featured on the BBC's The One Show and Radio 4.

Transport
The Nottingham Suburban Railway ran through the area, connecting Trent Lane junction in Sneinton with Daybrook, but bomb damage closed the Sneinton end in 1941 and the line ceased operations completely in 1951.

Bus services 
Nottingham City Transport
 39: Nottingham → St Ann's (Beacon Hill Rise) → Thorneywood → Carlton Valley

 40: Nottingham → St Ann's → Sherwood → City Hospital Campus

 40B: Nottingham → St Ann's → The Wells Road Top

 41: Nottingham → St Ann's

 42: Nottingham → St Ann's

Silverdale Tours
 S11: St Ann's → Carlton → Netherfield

Education
Blue Bell Hill Primary School is on Gordon Road along with Our Lady & St. Edwards Primary. The Wells Academy provides secondary education, along with the new St Ann's Well Academy on Hungerhill Rd. There is also Sycamore Academy and Huntingdon Academy.

Religion

The parish church is St. Ann with Emmanuel; the RCCG Covenant Restoration Assembly St Anns meet in Blue Bell Hill Community Centre.

There are also two Mosques in the area with one in the Pakistani Centre and the Islamic Center.

Sport
There are few sports facilities actually in St Ann's, but across the ring road is the National Ice Centre, an Olympic-sized ice rink that is both home to the Nottingham Panthers, and also acts a major music venue of Nottingham. Nottingham Racecourse, the local horse racing track, and the Nottingham Greyhound Stadium are also nearby.

Media
Nottingham film-maker Shane Meadows used St Ann's for some scenes in the 2006 drama This Is England filmed in St Ann's.

Ray Gosling, broadcaster and writer, lived in St Ann's and wrote about it. He also introduced a film about poverty in the area by Thames Television.

Social issues
There have been three academic studies based on the working class community of St Anns:
 Poverty: The Forgotten Englishman, by Ken Coates and Bill Silburn : University of Nottingham
 Getting by: by Lisa McKenzie, LSE
 Narratives From a Nottingham Council Estate: a Story of White Working-Class Mothers With Mixed-Race Children, Ethnic and Racial Studies, by Lisa McKenzie

See also
 St Ann's riots
St Ann's – other places with the same name
The Meadows, Nottingham- similar Radburn style estate

References
Notes

Bibliography
Gosling, Ray (1962), Sum Total. London: Faber. (Republished by Pomona in 2004. .)
Gosling, Ray (1967), Saint Ann's. Nottingham Civic Society.
Gosling, Ray (1980), Personal Copy: a memoir of the sixties. London: Faber. .

External links

STAA – St. Ann's Allotments
Stonebridge City Farm
Ecoworks – community organisation based on St Ann's Allotments
 The Renewal Trust manage St Ann's Allotments and provide community regeneration
Report, St Annes, Thames TV 1969, Nottingham Slums

Areas of Nottingham
History of Nottingham
Nottingham
Nottingham